Kibuku is a town in Eastern Uganda. It is the chief municipal, administrative and commercial center of Kibuku District.

Location
The coordinates of the town are:01 02 15N, 33 50 24E (Latitude:1.0375; Longitude:33.8400). Kibuku does not yet appear on most publicly available maps, as of December 2010.

Population
In 2013, the population of Kibuku Municipality was estimated at 25,000 people. The next national population census in Uganda is planned for August 2014.

Points of interest
 The headquarters of Kibuku District Administration
 The offices of Kibuku Town Council
 Kibuku Central Market - The largest source of fresh produce in the town
 Beacon of Hope Uganda - Kibuku offices a non-government community development organization working in Kibuku district

Famous people
Jennifer Namuyangu - Former State Minister for Water Resources in the Ugandan Cabinet, from 1 June 2006 until 27 May 2011. Former elected Member of Parliament for Pallisa District Women's Representative, from 2001 until 2011. In 2010, Pallisa District was split into two, to create Kibuku District. Jennifer contested for the seat of "Kibuku County", Kibuku District. She lost to Saleh Kamba.
Saleh Kamba - Elected Member of Parliament for "Kibuku County", Kibuku District.

See also
Kibuku District
Eastern Region, Uganda

References

External links
 Jennifer Namuyangu Comes From Kibuku District

Populated places in Uganda
Kibuku District